Antonis Katsis (born 6 September 1989, in Larnaca) is a Cypriot footballer who plays as central midfielder for Omonia Aradippou in the Cypriot Second Division.

Career
He has been elected through the Academies of AEK Larnaca. Since 2006 he was promoted to the first team of AEK Larnaca. For the 2009-2010, he transferred to AC Omonia where he celebrated his first title.

International career
He played for the first time with the national team on the 11 November 2011 in a friendly match against Scotland where Cyprus lost 1-2.

Honours
AC Omonia
Cypriot Championship: 2010

External links

1989 births
Living people
Cypriot footballers
Cyprus international footballers
Association football midfielders
Greek Cypriot people
AEK Larnaca FC players
Ermis Aradippou FC players
AC Omonia players
Alki Larnaca FC players
Nea Salamis Famagusta FC players
Ethnikos Achna FC players
Ayia Napa FC players
AEZ Zakakiou players
Othellos Athienou F.C. players
Omonia Aradippou players
Cypriot First Division players
Cypriot Second Division players